John Anthony Llewellyn (22 April 1933 – 2 July 2013), was a Welsh-born American scientist and a former NASA astronaut candidate.

Biography
Llewellyn was born 22 April 1933, in Cardiff, Wales, United Kingdom, and graduated from Cardiff High School in 1949.  He received his BSc degree from University College, Cardiff in 1955 and went on to achieve his PhD degree in chemistry in 1958. He married Valerie Mya Davies-Jones, and they had three children.

Post-education
After the award of his doctorate, Llewellyn moved to Ottawa, Ontario, Canada and served as a post-doctoral fellow at the National Research Council. In 1960, he went to Florida State University as a research associate in the Chemistry Department and was subsequently appointed Assistant Professor. In 1964, he was jointly appointed associate professor in both the School of Engineering Science and the Department of Chemistry.

Diving
Having been taught to dive by aquanaut Jacques Cousteau, Llewellyn served as training director for Florida State University's diver training program. This was one of the first scuba diving certification programs in the United States. Among those he certified was sixteen year old E. Lee Spence, who received his certification on 10 July 1964. Spence went on to become one of the pioneers of underwater archaeology. Llewellyn's diving gave him experience in the feeling of weightlessness, which helped prepare him for his later training as an astronaut.

NASA selection
Llewellyn was selected as a scientist-astronaut by NASA in August 1967. He participated in flight training as part of NASA Astronaut Group 6; however, he dropped out of flight school and resigned from NASA in September 1968. Llewellyn needed to learn to fly jets, and was not able to fly the jet with the cockpit blacked out.

Post-NASA experience
While with the University of South Florida's Department of Chemical Engineering, Llewellyn also served as Director of the College of Engineering's computing department, and later as University Director of Academic Computing, where he helped initiate USF's programs in High-Performance Computing and electronic and distance learning.  In 2007, he retired from the directorship position and served as Professor Emeritus in the Department of Chemical and Biomedical Engineering until his death.  His research interests included the development of impedance-based sensor measurement methods and instrumentation for invivo monitoring of tissue after the application of an electric field mediated plasmid delivery protocol (IEEE Transactions on Dielectrics and Electrical Insulation 16(5): 1348–1355. His current work was presented at the 2010 American Society for Gene and Cell Therapy and he was an invited session leader at the 2010 Gordon Conference in Bioelectrochemistry.

Death
Llewellyn died on 2 July 2013 after suffering a stroke.

Notes

Further reading
Llewellyn's career is chronicled in the book "NASA's Scientist-Astronauts" by David Shayler and Colin Burgess.

1933 births
2013 deaths
Alumni of Cardiff University
American astronauts
Florida State University faculty
NASA people
Scientists from Cardiff
Welsh emigrants to the United States
British astronauts